Gymnelia hyaloxantha is a moth of the subfamily Arctiinae. It was described by Paul Dognin in 1914. It is found in Colombia.

References

Gymnelia
Moths described in 1914